The Big Thief is a 1922 German silent film directed by Rudolf Walther-Fein and starring Colette Corder, Paul Hardtmuth and Hermann Picha.

Cast

References

External links

1922 films
Films of the Weimar Republic
German silent feature films
Films directed by Rudolf Walther-Fein
German black-and-white films
1920s German films